The Box Springs Mountains are a mountain range in northwest Riverside County, California, United States.

Parks 

The Box Spring Mountain Reserve, operated by the Riverside County Regional Park and Open-Space District, encompasses a portion of the Box Spring Mountains.

Named Peaks

References 

Mountain ranges of Riverside County, California
Peninsular Ranges
Mountain ranges of Southern California